Cross Lough is a freshwater lake in the west of Ireland. It is located in northwest County Mayo on the Mullet Peninsula.

Geography

See also
List of loughs in Ireland

References

Cross